The  was a tankette used by the Imperial Japanese Army in the Second Sino-Japanese War, at Nomonhan against the Soviet Union, and in World War II. It was designed as a fast reconnaissance vehicle, and was a replacement for the earlier Type 94 tankette.

History and development
The origins of the Type 97 lay in a prototype diesel-engine version of the Type 94 Te-Ke developed by Hino Motors in 1936. Although the prototype had a more powerful engine and larger gun, initial trials were not successful and the Japanese Army demanded changes before acceptance. Hino responded with a modified prototype in November 1937, in which the engine was moved towards the rear of the chassis. This design was accepted and full production began in 1938. A total of 616 units were produced from 1938 to 1944 (1 unit in 1937, 56 units in 1938, 217 units in 1939, 284 units in 1940, 58 units between 1941 and 1944).

Design

Although the chassis was similar in appearance, the design of the Type 97 was different from the Type 94 in several significant areas. The engine was moved to the rear and the gun turret (commander position) moved to the middle of the tankette, with the driver located to the left side of the hull. This gave the two men a better position to communicate with each other. As with the Type 94, the interior was lined with heat absorbing asbestos sheets.

The main armament was the Type 94 37 mm tank gun, with 96 rounds, barrel length of 136 cm (L36.7), EL angle of fire of −15 to +20 degrees, AZ angle of fire of 20 degrees, muzzle velocity of 600 m/s, penetration of 45 mm/300 m, which was also used by Type 95 Ha-Go. However, due to shortages in the production of this weapon, many vehicles were fitted with a 7.7 mm Type 97 machine gun instead.

The Type 97 replaced the Type 94 on the assembly line in 1939, it was primarily assigned to reconnaissance regiments, and, as with US Army tanks prior to 1941, it was not designed to engage enemy tanks. Because it was a reconnaissance vehicle, built for speed, and not direct combat, its hull and turret were designed for only two crewmen; leaving the tankette commander to load and fire the main gun. As with most tankettes it was severely deficient in armor protection, and was prey for any "anti-tank weapon".

Variants
Several variants of the Type 97 were produced. The Type 98 So-Da APC was designed for use as an armored personnel and ammunition carrier. Production of the vehicle began in 1941. The Type 100 Te-Re, which was designed for use as an artillery observation vehicle. It went into production in 1940. Another variant saw the Type 97 modified into the Ki-To SPAAG, armed with a single Type 98 20mm autocannon.

In addition, the Type 97 Disinfecting Vehicle and Type 97 Gas Scattering Vehicle were produced. They were based on the Type 97 Te-Ke chassis, but had a Type 94 tankette turret. The Type 97 Te-Ke was modified and used as a "tractor"; closed for protection against the chemical agents. It would pull either a configured independent tracked mobile liquid dissemination chemical vehicle or a respective tracked mobile disinfecting anti-chemical agents vehicle. They operated in the same way as the predecessors, the Type 94 Disinfecting Vehicle and Type 94 Gas Scattering Vehicle.

Operational history

Typically, Type 97s were distributed to support infantry divisions, where they were very often used as armored tractors, supply vehicles, and for recon/scouting.

The Type 97 was successfully fielded in China during the Second Sino-Japanese War of 1938–1945, as the Chinese National Revolutionary Army had only three tank battalions, which themselves consisted of some Italian CV33 tankettes. Their light weight enabled them to be transported easily across the sea or rivers. The Type 97 tankettes first real test of combat came during the Battle of Nomonhan during the months of May through August in 1939 against the Red Army of the Soviet Union. Although not designed for such combat, the 97 tankette went up against Russian anti-tank guns and 45mm high velocity guns of the Soviet BT-5 and BT-7 light tanks. The Japanese tank force in which they were included was decimated.

With the start of World War II, the Type 97 contributed to the Japanese victories at the Battle of Malaya and the Battle of the Philippines, as its light weight enabled the tank to traverse unsupported bridges and ferry crossing that would be unable to take heavier tanks, and its small size allowed it to travel along the long winding and narrow roads in the area.

In popular culture
The Type 97 Te-Ke is also the tank used by Shizuka Tsuruki and Rin in the manga Girls und Panzer Ribbon Warrior, spinoff of the anime series Girls und Panzer

Notes

References

 
 
 Gander, Terry J (1995). Jane's Tanks of World War II. Harper Collins.

External links

History of War:Type 97 Te-Ke Tankette
Taki's Imperial Japanese Army Page: Type 97 Tankette "Te-Ke"

World War II tankettes
Tankettes of Japan
Reconnaissance vehicles
Toyota Group
Reconnaissance vehicles of Japan
Reconnaissance vehicles of World War II
Tracked reconnaissance vehicles
Tankettes
Military vehicles introduced in the 1930s